The Renault Monasix (Type RY) was a compact car or small family car manufactured between 1927 and 1932 by Renault.

Overview 

The car was considered a commercial failure mainly because the engine was too small for the car's length and weight, which often led to problems in keeping the car under control. Renault ended production of the car in 1932. With its 1,476 cc displacement the engine, of an 8CV tax horsepower rating, was one of the smallest six cylinder engines available at the time.

Starting in 1928, the "Compagnie Générale des voitures à Paris", the main Paris taxi company, purchased a large number of the cars and painted them in the same shade of green as that used for the city's buses: 5,000 taxi versions were made, the last of which were used in Paris until 1962.

In competition, the Monasix was raced in the Morocco Rally in 1928.

The Monastella version was an upgraded version of Monasix with better trim.

Production ended in 1932 and the car was replaced by the Renault Monaquatre.

Types 
RY : Produced from 1927 to 1928 with the radiator behind the engine (no front grill: side gills on hood) storage below doors
RY1: Produced from 1928 to 1929 with the radiator behind the engine (no front grill: side gills on hood) no storage below doors
RY2: Produced from 1929 to 1931 radiator in front of the engine, front grille, no side gills on bonnet
RY3: Produced from 1931 to 1932 radiator in front of the engine, front grille, side gills on bonnet

Characteristics 
Speed: 
Power:  (8CV)

References

External links 

Renault Monasix--A real dabbler!

Monasix
1920s cars
Cars introduced in 1927